Lieutenant Colonel William Henry Rankin (October 16, 1920 – July 6, 2009) was one of only two known persons to survive a fall from the top of a cumulonimbus thunderstorm cloud; the other was Ewa Wiśnierska. He was a pilot in the United States Marine Corps and a World War II and Korean War veteran. He was flying an F-8 Crusader jet fighter over a cumulonimbus cloud when the engine failed, forcing him to eject and parachute into the cloud. Rankin wrote a book about his experience, The Man Who Rode the Thunder.

Ejection
On July 26, 1959, Rankin was flying from Naval Air Station South Weymouth, Massachusetts, to Marine Corps Air Station Beaufort in South Carolina. The engine stopped, and a fire warning light flashed. He pulled the lever to deploy auxiliary power, and it broke off in his hand. Though not wearing a pressure suit, at 6:00 pm he ejected into the  air. He suffered immediate frostbite, and decompression caused his eyes, ears, nose, and mouth to bleed. His abdomen swelled severely. He did, however, manage to make use of his emergency oxygen supply. 

Five minutes after he abandoned the plane, his parachute had not opened. While in the upper regions of the thunderstorm, with near-zero visibility, the parachute opened prematurely instead of at  because the storm had affected the barometric parachute switch and caused it to open. After ten minutes, Rankin was still aloft, carried by updrafts and getting hit by hailstones. Violent spinning and pounding caused him to vomit. Lightning appeared, which he described as blue blades several feet thick, and thunder that he could feel. The rain forced him to hold his breath to keep from drowning. One lightning bolt lit up the parachute, making Rankin believe he had died. 

Conditions calmed, and he descended into a forest. His watch read 6:40 pm. It had been 40 minutes since he had ejected. He searched for help and eventually was admitted into a hospital at Ahoskie, North Carolina. He suffered from frostbite, welts, bruises, and severe decompression.

In popular culture
Rankin wrote The Man Who Rode the Thunder about his experience; Floyd C. Gale called the book a "thrilling true adventure". His story was covered in the March 2, 2017 episode of The Dollop Podcast.

See also 
 Cloud suck

References

1920 births
2009 deaths
People from Pittsburgh
United States Marine Corps officers
Parachuting
American aviators
Joint Forces Staff College alumni
United States Marine Corps pilots of World War II
United States Marine Corps personnel of the Korean War